The 2020–21 National Basketball League (Bulgaria) season is the 80th season of the Bulgarian NBL.

Teams

Academic Sofia resigned from the league due to financial difficulties.

Regular season
In the regular season, teams play against each other three times home-and-away in a double round-robin format. The eight first qualified teams advance to the playoffs.

League table
</onlyinclude>

Results

Playoffs

Bracket

Player of the round

Bulgarian clubs in European competitions

NBL clubs in regional competitions

References

National Basketball League (Bulgaria) seasons
Bulgarian